Axinoptera orphnobathra is a moth in the family Geometridae. It is found on Borneo and Peninsular Malaysia.

The ground colour of the wings is dirty brownish grey with black fasciation.

References

Moths described in 1958
Eupitheciini
Moths of Asia